The canton of Caen-2 is an administrative division of the Calvados department, northwestern France. Its borders were modified at the French canton reorganisation which came into effect in March 2015. Its seat is in Caen.

Composition

It consists of the following communes:
Authie
Caen (partly)
Carpiquet
Saint-Contest
Saint-Germain-la-Blanche-Herbe
Villons-les-Buissons

Councillors

Pictures of the canton

References

Cantons of Calvados (department)